The 1884 United States presidential election in Illinois took place on November 4, 1884, as part of the 1884 United States presidential election. Voters chose 22 representatives, or electors to the Electoral College, who voted for president and vice president.

Illinois voted for the Republican nominee, James G. Blaine, over the Democratic nominee, Grover Cleveland. Blaine won the state by a narrow margin of 3.74%.

This is the first of only three elections in the history of the party that a Democrat won the presidency without winning Illinois (the others being 1916 and 1976).

Results

See also
 United States presidential elections in Illinois

References

Illinois
1884
1884 Illinois elections